The Idiots Act 1886 (49 Vict.c.25) was an act of Parliament of the United Kingdom. It was intended to give "... facilities for the care, education, and training of Idiots and Imbeciles".

The Act made, for the first time, the distinction between "lunatics", "idiots", and "imbeciles" for the purpose of making entry into education establishments easier and for defining the ways they were cared for.

Before the Act, learning institutions for idiots and imbeciles were seen as either "licensed houses" or "registered hospitals" for lunatics, for which the parents of children hoping to enter would have to complete a form stating that they were "a lunatic, an idiot, or a person of unsound mind". Additionally, they were required to answer irrelevant questions and present two medical certificates.

The Act was repealed by the Mental Deficiency Act 1913, by which time two further classifications had been introduced: "feeble-minded people" and "moral defectives".

References

Notes

United Kingdom Acts of Parliament 1886
Mental health legal history of the United Kingdom